Araneida is a subgroup of Tetrapulmonata. It was originally defined by Jörg Wunderlich in 2015 as a subgroup of Araneae, including all true spiders, with Wunderlich also including Uraraneida within Araneae. Araneida was redefined by Wunderlich in 2019 to include all modern spiders (Araneae), as well as Chimerarachnida, but excluding Uraraneida. Chimerarachnida and Araneae both possess spinnerets, which are absent in Uraraneida. Uraraneida and Araneida are grouped together in the clade Serikodiastida.

See also 
Araneidae

References

Spiders
Arthropod suborders